Operation Astrakan was a raid by British Commandos during the Second World War. The objective of the operation was to gather reconnaissance for Operation Sunstar.
The raid against Houlgate in France  was carried out  by No. 101 (Folbot) Troop, No. 6 Commando over the night of 12/13 November 1941.

References

Conflicts in 1941
World War II British Commando raids
1941 in France
Military history of Normandy